Dortmund-Somborn station is a railway station in the Dortmund district of Somborn in the German state of North Rhine-Westphalia. It is classified by Deutsche Bahn as a category 6 station. It was opened on 23 May 1993 on a new line completed on the same date between Dortmund-Germania and Dortmund Lütgendortmund.

It is served by Rhine-Ruhr S-Bahn line S 4 at 30-minute intervals (15-minute intervals in the peak between Dortmund-Lütgendortmund and ).

References

S4 (Rhine-Ruhr S-Bahn)
Rhine-Ruhr S-Bahn stations
Railway stations in Dortmund
Railway stations in Germany opened in 1993